The Dorman Baronetcy, of Nunthorpe in the County of York, is a title in the Baronetage of the United Kingdom. It was created on 21 July 1923 for the steel manufacturer Arthur Dorman. He was the founder and chairman of Dorman Long & Co, of Middlesbrough.

Dorman baronets, of Nunthorpe (1923)
Sir Arthur John Dorman, 1st Baronet (1848–1931)
Sir Bedford Lockwood Dorman, 2nd Baronet (1879–1956)
Sir Charles Geoffrey Dorman, 3rd Baronet (1920–1996)
Sir Philip Henry Keppel Dorman, 4th Baronet (born 1954)

Notes

References
Kidd, Charles, Williamson, David (editors). Debrett's Peerage and Baronetage (1990 edition). New York: St Martin's Press, 1990,

External links
Picture of Sir Arthur Dorman, 1st Baronet

Dorman